The Abkhazia–Georgia separation line is a de facto boundary set up in aftermath of the War in Abkhazia and Russo-Georgian War, which separates the self-declared Republic of Abkhazia from the territory controlled by the Government of Georgia. Republic of Abkhazia, and those states that recognise its independence, view the line as an international border separating two sovereign states, whereas the Georgian government and most other countries refer to it as an 'Administrative Border Line' within Georgian territory. The Georgian government views Abkhazia as a Russian-occupied Georgian territory and designates the de facto boundary as an occupation line in accordance with the Georgian "Law on Occupied Territories of Georgia". The Constitution of Georgia recognizes Abkhazia as autonomous within Georgia, therefore the line corresponds to the 'Administrative Border' of the Autonomous Republic of Abkhazia within Georgian territory.

Description

The border starts in the north at the tripoint with Russia on the Caucasus Mountains, and proceeds overland in a broadly south-westwards directions past peaks such as Mounts Kharikhra, Moguashirkha and Akiba. In the southern stretches it runs along the Enguri River, before terminating at the Black Sea coast just north of Anaklia.

History
During the 19th the Caucasus region was contested between the declining Ottoman Empire, Persia and Russia, which was expanding southwards. Russia formally annexed the eastern Georgian Kingdom of Kartli and Kakheti in 1801, followed by the western Georgian Kingdom of Imereti in 1804 and made Abkhazia its protectorate in 1810. Construction of the  Georgian Military Road was begun in 1799, following the Treaty of Georgievsk. Over the course of the 1800s Russia continued to push its frontier southwards, at the expense of the Persian and Ottoman Empires.

 
The Georgian territories were initially organised into the Georgia Governorate, then later split off as the Georgia-Imeretia Governorate from 1840–46, and finally divided into the governorates of Tiflis and Kutaisi. The northern border of these territories roughly corresponds with the modern Georgia-Russia border i.e. running along the Caucasus Mountain range. Abkhazia was formed as semi-autonomous region in 1810, with a border with Georgia set along the river Ghalizga. In 1864 Abkhazia was re-designated as the 'Sukhum Military District' (from 1883 Sukhum Okrug, within Kutaisi Governorate), incorporating the Samurzakano region west of the Ingur river which had hitherto been part of Kutais governorate and had been disputed between the rulers of Abkhazia and Mingrelia. Over the following decades the ethnic makeup of Abkhazia changed due to influxes of Georgian and Russian settlers.

Following the 1917 Russian Revolution, the peoples of the southern Caucasus had seceded from Russia, declared the Transcaucasian Democratic Federative Republic (TDFR) in 1918 and started peace talks with the Ottomans. Meanwhile Sukhum Okrug had declared itself semi-autonomous on 9 November 1917 under the Abkhazian Peoples Council (APC). In early 1918 the APC met with Georgian leaders, and the two sides made an initial agreement that Abkhazia would constitute Sukhum okrug, including Samurzakano (despite its Mingrelian majority), and stretching along the Black Sea coast as far at the river Mzymta. The Bolsheviks invaded Abkhazia in April 1918 but were repulsed the following month.

Meanwhile internal disagreements in the TDFR led to Georgia leaving the federation in May 1918, followed shortly thereafter by Armenia and Azerbaijan. Georgian and Abkhaz officials met in an attempt to hammer out a deal, with Georgia pushing to include Abkhazia within Georgia but as an autonomous region, however many Abkhaz leaders feared that Georgia aimed to 'Georgian-ise' the region and annex it outright. Russia recognised the independence of Georgia via the Treaty of Moscow (1920). Meanwhile disputes between Abkhaz and Georgian officials continued, however these were rendered moot when in 1920 Russia's Red Army invaded Georgia in 1921. Abkhazia was designated as the Socialist Soviet Republic of Abkhazia, on the proviso that it would later join the Georgian Soviet Socialist Republic under a 'special union treaty'. Georgia was later incorporated along with Armenia and Azerbaijan in the Transcaucasian SFSR within the USSR. The Georgian SSR was reconstituted in 1936, incorporating Abkhazia as the (downgraded) Abkhaz Autonomous Soviet Socialist Republic.

Tensions between Abkhazia and Georgia were already evident by the late 1970s, with both sides organising protests in 1978 alleging discrimination, prompting intervention by Moscow. Tensions simmered throughout the 1980s, though were stoked in latter part of the decade with the advent of perestroika and glasnost under Mikhail Gorbachev, with the Abkhaz pushing for full SSR status in 1988 and ethnic riots breaking out in Sukhumi in 1989. Thereafter Abkhaz officials unilaterally declared the area an SSR. After Georgia declared independence in 1991 a compromise was brokered between Georgian President Zviad Gamsakhurdia and the Abkhaz leadership, however Gamsakhurdia was removed in a coup in 1992 and replaced with a more hardline nationalist government under Eduard Shevardnadze. Abkhazia declared independence in August 1992 and war broke out with Georgia. After fierce fighting the Abkhaz forces pushed the Georgians out of most of Abkhazia (save for the Kodori Gorge) and a ceasefire was arranged in May 1994. Roughly 8,000 people on both sides had been killed many more made refugees, with most Georgians in Abkhazia either fleeing or being forced out of the area. Further clashes along the border occurred in 1998, 2001 and 2006, along with numerous other small skirmishes.

Tensions increased following the election of Mikheil Saakashvili as Georgian President in 2004, with Saakashvili vowing to restore Georgian control over the breakaway regions of Abkhazia, Ajara and South Ossetia. In 2008 Georgia attempted to wrest back South Ossetia, sparking a war with Russia. Abkhaz forces, backed by Russia, used the occasion to force Georgia out of the Kodori Gorge, thus gaining full control of all the territory of the former Abkhaz ASSR. Following the war Russia recognised the independence of both South Ossetia and Abkhazia. The Abkhaz-Georgian border is currently guarded by the Russian and Abkhaz militaries and has been strengthened since the war, with barbed wire, control towers and other border control infrastructure being built.

Border crossings

There is one legal crossing point, at a bridge over the Enguri river between Gali (Abkhazia) and Zugdidi (Samegrelo).

See also
 Abkhaz–Georgian conflict

References

Works cited
 

 
Internal borders of the Soviet Union
Borders of Georgia (country)
Borders of Abkhazia